Hyunsa is the highest enlisted South Korean military rank, equivalent to a Command Sergeant Major in most other countries.  The rank of Hyunsa means Wise and respected NCO.
The rank of Hyunsa is newly added to ROK army in 2014 as the highest NCO rank.  Those holding the rank of Hyunsa are eligible to be promoted to Junwi, considered the only Warrant Officer rank of the South Korean armed forces.

Military ranks of South Korea